Jingkou railway station is a railway station located in Shapingba District, Chongqing, People's Republic of China, on the Suiyu railway which operated by China Railway Corporation.

Structure

Service

Railway stations in Chongqing
Stations on the Chengdu–Chongqing Intercity Railway